Relations between the European Union (EU) and Turkey were established in 1959, and the institutional framework was formalised with the 1963 Ankara Agreement. Albeit not officially part of the European Union, Turkey is one of the EU's main partners and both are members of the European Union–Turkey Customs Union. Turkey borders two EU member states: Bulgaria and Greece.

Turkey has been an applicant to accede to the EU since 1987, but since 2016 accession negotiations have stalled. The EU has criticised Turkey for human rights violations and deficits in rule of law. In 2017, EU officials expressed the view that planned Turkish policies violate the Copenhagen criteria of eligibility for EU membership. On 26 June 2018, the EU's General Affairs Council stated that "the Council notes that Turkey has been moving further away from the European Union. Turkey's accession negotiations have therefore effectively come to a standstill and no further chapters can be considered for opening or closing and no further work towards the modernisation of the EU-Turkey Customs Union is foreseen."

Background 

After the Ottoman Empire's collapse following World War I, Turkish revolutionaries led by Mustafa Kemal Atatürk emerged victorious in the Turkish War of Independence, establishing the modern Turkish Republic as it exists today. Atatürk, President of Turkey, implemented a series of reforms, including secularisation and industrialisation, intended to "Europeanise" or Westernise the country. During World War II, Turkey remained neutral until February 1945, when it joined the Allies. The country took part in the Marshall Plan of 1947, became a member of the Council of Europe in 1950, and a member of NATO in 1952. During the Cold War, Turkey allied itself with the United States and Western Europe. The Turkish expert Meltem Ahıska outlines the Turkish position vis-à-vis Europe, explaining how "Europe has been an object of desire as well as a source of frustration for Turkish national identity in a long and strained history".

Foreign relations policies of the Republic of Turkey have – based on the Western-inspired reforms of Mustafa Kemal Atatürk – placed heavy emphasis on Turkey's relationship with the Western world, especially in relation to the United States, the North Atlantic Treaty Organization and the European Union. The post-Cold War period has seen a diversification of relations, with Turkey seeking to strengthen its regional presence in the Balkans, the Middle East and the Caucasus, as well as its historical goal of EU membership. Under the AKP government, Turkey's influence has grown in the Middle East based on the strategic depth doctrine, also called Neo-Ottomanism. Debate on Turkey in the West is sharply divided between those who see Turkey moving away from the West toward a more Middle Eastern and Islamic orientation and those who see Ankara's improved ties with its Islamic neighbors as a natural progression toward balance and diversification.

History of relations 

Turkey was one of the first countries, in 1959, to seek close cooperation with the young European Economic Community (EEC). This cooperation was realised in the framework of an association agreement, known as the Ankara Agreement, which was signed on 12 September 1963. An important element in this plan was establishing a customs union so that Turkey could trade goods and agricultural products with EEC countries without restrictions. The main aim of the Ankara agreement was to achieve "continuous improvement in living conditions in Turkey and in the European Economic Community through accelerated economic progress and the harmonious expansion of trade, and to reduce the disparity between the Turkish economy and … the Community".

Accession negotiations 

Enlargement is one of the EU's most powerful policy tools. It is a carefully managed process which helps the transformation of the countries involved, extending peace, stability, prosperity, democracy, human rights and the rule of law across Europe. The European Union enlargement process took a bold step on 3 October 2005 when accession negotiations were opened with Turkey and Croatia. After years of preparation the two candidates formally opened the next stage of the accession process. The negotiations relate to the adoption and implementation of the EU body of law, known as the acquis. The acquis is approximately 130,000 pages of legal documents grouped into 35 chapters and forms the rules by which Member States of the EU should adhere. As a candidate country, Turkey needs to adapt a considerable part of its national legislation in line with EU law. This means fundamental changes for society that will affect almost all sectors of the country, from the environment to the judiciary, from transport to agriculture, and across all sections of the population. However, the candidate country does not 'negotiate' on the acquis communautaire itself as these 'rules' must be fully adopted by the candidate country. The negotiation aspect is on the conditions for harmonisation and implementation of the acquis, that is, how the rules are going to be applied and when. It is for this reason that accession negotiations are not considered to be negotiations in the classical sense. In order to become a Member State, the candidate country must bring its institutions, management capacity and administrative and judicial systems up to EU standards, both at national and regional level. This allows them to implement the acquis effectively upon accession and, where necessary, to be able to implement it effectively in good time before accession. This requires a well-functioning and stable public administration built on an efficient and impartial civil service, and an independent and efficient judicial system.

On 24 November 2016 the European Parliament voted to suspend accession negotiations with Turkey over human rights and rule of law concerns; however, this decision was non-binding. On 13 December, the European Council (comprising the heads of state or government of the member states) resolved that it would open no new areas in Turkey's membership talks in the "prevailing circumstances", as Turkey's path toward autocratic rule makes progress on EU accession impossible.

In 2016, EU member Austria opposed Turkey's EU membership. In March 2018, former Austrian Chancellor Sebastian Kurz opposed Turkey's EU accession talks and urged it to halt membership talks.

In 2017, EU officials expressed that planned Turkish policies violate the Copenhagen criteria of eligibility for an EU membership.

On 26 June 2018, the EU's General Affairs Council stated that "the Council notes that Turkey has been moving further away from the European Union. Turkey's accession negotiations have therefore effectively come to a standstill and no further chapters can be considered for opening or closing and no further work towards the modernisation of the EU-Turkey Customs Union is foreseen." The Council added that it is "especially concerned about the continuing and deeply worrying backsliding on the rule of law and on fundamental rights including the freedom of expression."

Key milestones

1963: The association agreement is signed between Turkey and the EEC.
1987: Turkey submits application for full membership.
1993: The EU and Turkey Customs Union negotiations start.
1996: The Customs Union between Turkey and the EU takes effect.
1999: At the Helsinki Summit, the European Council gives Turkey the status of candidate country for EU membership, following the Commission's recommendation in its second Regular Report on Turkey.
2001: The European Council adopts the EU-Turkey Accession Partnership, providing a road map for Turkey's EU accession process. The Turkish Government adopts the NPAA, the National Programme for the Adoption of the Acquis, reflecting the Accession Partnership. At the Copenhagen Summit, the European Council decides to significantly increase EU financial support through what is now called the "pre-accession instrument" (IPA).
2004: The European Council decides to open accession negotiations with Turkey.
2005: Accession negotiations open.
2016: The European Parliament votes to suspend accession negotiations with Turkey over human rights and rule of law concerns.
2018: The EU's General Affairs Council states that "Turkey has been moving further away from the European Union. Turkey's accession negotiations have therefore effectively come to a standstill and no further chapters can be considered for opening or closing and no further work towards the modernisation of the EU-Turkey Customs Union is foreseen."

Institutional cooperation 
The association agreement that Turkey has with the EU serves as the basis for implementation of the accession process. Several institutions have been set up to ensure political dialogue and cooperation throughout the membership preparation process.

Association Council

The Council is made up of representatives of the Turkish government, the European Council and the European Commission. It is instrumental in shaping and orienting Turkey-EU relations. Its aim is to implement the association agreement in political, economic and commercial issues. The Association Council meets twice a year at ministerial level. The Council takes decisions unanimously. Turkey and the EU side have one vote each.

Association Committee

The Association Committee brings together experts from EU and Turkey to examine Association related technical issues and to prepare the agenda of the Association Council. The negotiations chapters are discussed in eight subcommittees organised as follows:
 Agriculture and Fisheries Committee
 Internal Market and Competition Committee
 Trade, Industry and ECSC Products Committee
 Economic and Monetary Issues Committee
 Innovation Committee
 Transport, Environment and Energy Committee
 Regional Development, Employment and Social Policy Committee
 Customs, Taxation, Drug Trafficking and Money Laundering Committee
Joint Parliamentary Commission

The Joint Parliamentary Commission is the control body of the Turkey-EU association. Its task is to analyze the annual activity reports submitted to it by the Association Council and to make recommendations on EU-Turkey Association related issues.

It consists of 18 members selected from the Turkish Grand National Assembly and the European Parliament, who meet twice a year.

Customs Union Joint Committee

The main task of the Customs Union Joint Committee (CUJC) is to establish a consultative procedure in order to ensure legislative harmony foreseen in the fields directly related to the functioning of the customs union between Turkey and the EU. The CUJC makes recommendations to the Association Council. It is planned to meet regularly once a month.

Joint Consultative Committee

The Joint Consultative Committee (JCC) was formed on 16 November 1995 in accordance with Article 25 of the Ankara Agreement. The Committee aims to promote dialogue and cooperation between the economic and social interest groups in the European Community and Turkey and to facilitate the institutionalisation of the partners of that dialogue in Turkey. The Joint Consultative Committee has a mixed, cooperative and two-winged structure, with EU and Turkey wings. It has 36 members in total, composed of 18 Turkish and 18 EU representatives and it has two elected co-chairmen, one from the Turkish side and the other from the EU side.

EU-related administrative bodies in Turkish administration

The Secretariat General for European Union Affairs was established in July 2000 to ensure internal coordination and harmony in the preparation of Turkey for EU membership.

The Under secretariat of Foreign Trade EU Executive Board was established to ensure the direction, follow-up and finalisation of work carried out within the scope of the Customs Union and the aim of integration.

Timeline of notable positions and statements

 In the 1920s, Mustafa Kemal Atatürk, the founder of the Republic of Turkey, said that "there are different cultures, but only one civilisation," making it clear that he was not referring to Islamic civilisation: "We Turks have always gone from east to west."
 In November 2002, the AKP led by later prime minister and president Recep Tayyip Erdoğan was first elected into power, which it has held since. Islamist Erdoğan is famous for the quote that "democracy is like a tram. We shall get out when we arrive at the station we want."
 In July 2007, European Commission President José Manuel Barroso said that Turkey is not ready to join the EU "tomorrow nor the day after tomorrow", but its membership negotiations should continue. He also called on France and other member states to honour the decision to continue accession talks, describing it as a matter of credibility for the Union.
 In September 2011, German Chancellor Angela Merkel has said on the occasion of the visit of the Turkish president Abdullah Gül: "We don't want the full membership of Turkey. But we don't want to lose Turkey as an important country", referring to her idea of a strategic partnership.
 In June 2013 Turkey's Undersecretary of the Ministry of EU Affairs Haluk Ilıcak said, "The process means more than the accession. Once the necessary levels are achieved, Turkey is big enough to continue its development without the accession. Our aim is to achieve a smooth accession process."
 During the 2014 European Parliament election campaign, presidential candidates Jean-Claude Juncker (EEP) and Martin Schulz (S&D) promised that Turkey would never join the European Union while either one of them were president, reasoning that Turkey had turned its back on European democratic values. Juncker won the election and became the new president of the EU as of 1 November 2014. He later reaffirmed his stance: "As regards Turkey, the country is clearly far away from EU membership. A government that blocks Twitter is certainly not ready for accession."
 In 2016, the EU made a deal with Turkey and decided to give Turkey €6 billion ($7.3 billion) the next period in order to help the country with the refugees and migrants living there (the contract ended in December 2020).
 In March 2016, Turkish President Recep Tayyip Erdoğan said that democracy and freedom were "phrases" which had "absolutely no value" in Turkey, after calling for journalists, lawyers and politicians to be prosecuted as terrorists.
 In March 2017, in a speech given to supporters in the western Turkish city of Sakarya, Turkish President Recep Tayyip Erdoğan said, "my dear brothers, a battle has started between the cross and the crescent", after insulting European government politicians as "Nazis" in the weeks before. The same month, he threatened that Europeans would "not be able to walk safely on the streets" if they continued to ban Turkish ministers from addressing rallies in Europe. European politicians rejected Erdoğan's comments.
 In March 2017, Frank-Walter Steinmeier in his inaugural speech as President of Germany said that "the way we look (at Turkey) is characterized by worry, that everything that has been built up over years and decades is collapsing."
 "Everybody's clear that, currently at least, Turkey is moving away from a European perspective," European Commissioner Johannes Hahn, who oversees EU membership bids, said in May 2017. "The focus of our relationship has to be something else. We have to see what could be done in the future, to see if we can restart some kind of cooperation."
 In a TV debate in September 2017, German chancellor Angela Merkel and her challenger Martin Schulz both said that they would seek an end to Turkey's membership talks with the European Union.
 The European Commission's long-term budget proposal for the 2021–2027 period released in May 2018 included pre-accession funding for a Western Balkan Strategy for further enlargement, but omitted Turkey.
 In December 2020, Turkish President Recep Tayyip Erdoğan said that the EU has constantly applied sanctions since 1963 and that Turkey is not concerned about sanctions. He added that the EU is not honest with Turkey. These remarks came after the possibility of EU sanction due to Turkey's behavior towards Greece and Cyprus, both EU members.
 In December 2020, the EU extended support to Turkey for refugees and migrants until 2022. It will give an extra €485 million to Turkey.
 In August 2021, the EU sent firefighting planes to help Turkey during the 2021 Turkish wildfires.

Contemporary issues 

Relations with Turkey significantly deteriorated after the 2016–17 Turkish purges, including the suppression of its media freedom and the arrests of journalists, as well as the country's turn to authoritarianism under the AKP and Erdoğan.

Developing the customs union 

The 1996 Customs Union between the EU and Turkey in the view of both sides needs an upgrade to accommodate developments since its conclusion; however, as of 2017, technical negotiations to upgrade the customs union agreement to the advantage of both sides are complicated by ongoing tension between Ankara and Brussels. On 26 June 2018, reacting to the Turkish general election two days earlier, the EU's General Affairs Council stated that "the Council notes that Turkey has been moving further away from the European Union" and thus "no further work towards the modernisation of the EU-Turkey Customs Union is foreseen."

EU pre-accession support to Turkey

Turkey receives payments from the EU budget as pre-accession support, currently 4.5 billion allocated for the 2014–2020 period (about 740 million Euros per year). The European Parliament's resolution in November 2016 to suspend accession negotiations with Turkey over human rights and rule of law concerns called for the Commission to "reflect on the latest developments in Turkey" in its review of the funding program, The ALDE faction has called for a freezing of pre-accession funding. The EP's rapporteur on Turkey, Kati Piri, in April 2017 suggested the funds should be converted and concentrated to support those of the losing "No" side in the constitutional referendum, who share European values and are now under "tremendous pressure".

In June 2017, the EU's financial watchdog, the European Court of Auditors, announced that it would investigate the effectiveness of the pre-accessions funds which Turkey has received since 2007 to support rule of law, civil society, fundamental rights, democracy and governance reforms. Turkish media commented that "perhaps it can explain why this money apparently failed to have the slightest effect on efforts to prevent the deterioration of democracy in this country."

The European Commission's long-term budget proposal for the 2021–2027 period released in May 2018 included pre-accession funding for a Western Balkan Strategy for further enlargement, but omitted Turkey.

Turkey persecuting political dissenters as "terrorists" 

The increasing persecution of political dissenters as alleged "terrorists" in Turkey creates political tension between the EU and Turkey in both ways: while the EU criticises the abuse of "anti-terror" rhetoric and legislation to curb freedom of speech, Recep Tayyip Erdoğan frequently accuses EU member countries as well as the EU as a whole of "harboring terrorists" for giving safe haven to Turkish citizens who are persecuted because of their political opinions.

In April 2017, the Parliamentary Assembly of the Council of Europe (PACE) voted to reopen its monitoring procedure against Turkey. This vote is widely understood to deal a major blow to Turkey's goal of eventual EU membership, as exiting that process was made a precondition of EU accession negotiations back in 2004.

EU-Turkey deal on migrant crisis 

The 2015 refugee crisis had a great impact on relations. They became functional, based on interdependence as well as the EU's relative retreat from political membership conditionality. The March 2016 EU-Turkey 'refugee deal' made for deeper functional cooperation with material and normative concessions made by the EU.

On 20 March 2016, a deal between the EU and Turkey to tackle the migrant crisis formally came into effect. The agreement was intended to limit the influx of irregular migrants entering the EU through Turkey. A central aspect of the deal is the return to the Turkish capital of Ankara any irregular migrant who is found to have entered the EU through Turkey without having already undergone a formal asylum application process. Those that had bypassed the asylum process in Turkey would be returned and placed at the end of the application line.

Greece is often the first EU member-state entered by irregular migrants who have passed through Turkey. Greek islands such as Lesbos are hosting increasing numbers of irregular migrants who must now wait for the determination of asylum status before moving to their ultimate destinations elsewhere in Europe. Some 2,300 experts, including security and migration officials and translators, were set to arrive in Greece to help enforce the deal. "A plan like this cannot be put in place in only 24 hours," said government migration spokesman Giorgos Kyritsis, quoted by AFP. Additional administrative help will be necessary to process the increasing backlogs of migrants detained in Greece as a result of the EU-Turkey deal.

In exchange for Turkey's willingness to secure its borders and host irregular migrants, the EU agreed to resettle, on a 1:1 basis, Syrian migrants living in Turkey who had qualified for asylum and resettlement within the EU. The EU further incentivised Turkey to agree to the deal with a promise of lessening visa restrictions for Turkish citizens and by offering the Turkish government a payment of roughly six billion euros. Of these funds, roughly three billion euros were earmarked to support Syrian refugee communities living in Turkey.

By the end of 2017, the EU-Turkey deal had been successful in limiting irregular migration into Europe through Turkey. However, there are still many doubts about the implementation of the agreement, including how the deal may violate human rights protections outlined in the 1951 Geneva Convention Relating to the Status of Refugees. Critics have argued that the deal is essentially a deterrence strategy that seeks to encourage irregular migrants to file their asylum applications in Turkey rather than face being apprehended and sent back to Ankara, ultimately prolonging their application process.

In December 2020, the contract finished and EU extended it until 2022, giving extra €485 million to Turkey.

Key points from the agreement
 Turkey's EU accession negotiations: Both sides agreed to "re-energise" Turkey's bid to join the European bloc, with talks due by July 2016.
 Additional financial aid: The EU is to speed up the allocation of €3bn ($3.3 bn; £2.3 bn) in aid to Turkey to help Syrian migrant communities 
 Visa liberalisation process: Turkish nationals should have access to the Schengen passport-free zone by June 2016, provided that Turkey by then fulfills the known conditions for the step (see section below). This will not apply to non-Schengen countries like Britain.
 One-for-one: For each Syrian returned to Turkey, a Syrian migrant will be resettled in the EU. Priority will be given to those who have not tried to illegally enter the EU and the number is capped at 72,000.
 Returns: All "irregular migrants" crossing from Turkey into Greece from 20 March will be sent back. Each arrival will be individually assessed by the Greek authorities.
Emergency Relocation: Refugees waiting for asylum in Greece and Italy will be relocated to Turkey first, to reduce the strain on these states and improve living conditions for those seeking asylum.

Criticism

Critics have said the deal could force migrants determined to reach Europe to start using other and potentially more dangerous routes, such as the journey between North Africa and Italy.  Human rights groups have strongly criticiszed the deal, with Amnesty International accusing the EU of turning "its back on a global refugee crisis". A Chatham House paper argued that the deal, by excessively accommodating Erdoğan's demands, is encouraging Turkey to extract "more unilateral concessions in the future." One of the main issues many human rights organszations have with the deal is Turkey fails to meet the standards for hosting refugees. Specifically, many refugees are unable to apply for asylum while in Turkey and while there, they have low-quality living standards. Moreover, in Turkey, refugees are limited to specific areas, which are often lacking in critical infrastructure such as hospitals.

Effectiveness

As of 2019, the deal has had mixed success. It has drastically cut the number of migrants entering European countries, dropping by over half within three years. This result is the most pronounced in European countries situated farther west. However, the portion of the deal that dictated asylum seekers who landed in Greece would be returned to Turkey has been difficult to implement. A small percentage of these people were returned, amounting to 2,130 people. The risk of violating both European and international law has made this key portion of the deal far less successful than it was intended to be.

Turkey's dispute with Cyprus and Greece 

There is a long-standing dispute over Turkey's maritime boundaries with Greece and Cyprus and drilling rights in the eastern Mediterranean. Turkey does not recognise a legal continental shelf and exclusive economic zones around the Greek islands and Cyprus. Turkey is the only member state of the United Nations that does not recognise Cyprus, and is one of the few not signatory to the United Nations Convention on the Law of the Sea, which Cyprus has signed and ratified.

Visa liberalisation process

The EU Commissioner of Interior Affairs Cecilia Malmström indicated on 29 September 2011 that the visa requirement for Turkish citizens will eventually be discontinued. Visa liberalisation will be ushered in several phases. Initial changes were expected in the autumn of 2011, which would include the reduction of visa paperwork, more multi-entry visas, and extended stay periods. In June 2012, the EU authorised the beginning of negotiations with Turkey on visa exemptions for its citizens. Turkish EU Minister Egemen Bağış stated that he expected the process to take 3–4 years. The current visa policy of the EU is a cause of much concern for Turkish businessmen, politicians and Turks with family members in the EU. Egemen Bağış described the situation as: "Even non-candidate countries such as Russia, Ukraine, Moldova and Georgia are currently negotiating for visa-free travel." In September 2012, Turkish Economy Minister Zafer Çağlayan, during a meeting at the WKÖ, said: "We have had a Customs Union for 17 years, and half of our (Turkey's) external trade is with Europe. Our goods can move freely, but a visa is required for the owner of the goods. This is a violation of human rights."

In December 2013, after signing a readmission agreement, the EU launched a visa liberalisation dialogue with Turkey including a "Roadmap towards the visa-free regime".  After the November 2015 2015 G20 Antalya summit held in Antalya, Turkey, there was a new push forward in Turkey's EU accession negotiations, including a goal of lifting the visa requirement for Turkish citizens. The EU welcomed the Turkey's commitment to accelerate the fulfilment of the Visa Roadmap benchmarks set forth by participating EU member states.  A joint action plan was drafted with the European Commission which developed a roadmap with certain benchmarks for the elimination of the visa requirement.  The agreement called for abolishing visas for Turkish citizens within a year if certain conditions are satisfied.

On 18 March 2016, EU reached a migration agreement with Turkey, aiming at discouraging refugees from entering the EU. Under this deal, Turkey agreed to take back migrants who enter Greece and send legal refugees to EU. In exchange, EU agreed to give Turkey six billion euros, and to allow visa-free travel for Turkish citizens by the end of June 2016 if Turkey meets 72 conditions.  In March 2016, the EU assessed that Turkey at the time met 35 of the necessary 72 requirements for visa-free travel throughout Europe. In May 2016, this number had risen to 65 out of 72.

On 19 April 2016, Jean-Claude Juncker said that Turkey must meet the remaining criteria to win visa-free access to the Schengen area. But Turkish prime minister Ahmet Davutoğlu argued that Turkey would not support the EU-Turkey deal if EU did not weaken the visa conditions by June 2016.  In May 2016, the European Commission said that Turkey had met most of the 72 criteria needed for a visa waiver, and it invited EU legislative institutions of the bloc to endorse the move for visa-free travel by Turkish citizens within the Schengen Area by 30 June 2016. The European Parliament would have to approve the visa waiver for it to enter into force and Turkey must fulfil the final five criteria.  The five remaining benchmarks still to be met by Turkey include: 
 Turkey must pass measures to prevent corruption, in line with EU recommendations.
 Turkey must align national legislation on personal data protection with EU standards.
 Turkey needs to conclude an agreement with Europol.
 Turkey needs to work with all EU members on criminal matters. 
 Turkey must bring its terror laws in line with European standards.
As of August 26, 2021, these conditions had yet to be fulfilled. On 25 June 2021, the EU approved plans to pay Turkey a further three billion euros to update this agreement. In August 2021, however, with President Erdoğan's Justice and Development party polling at historic lows, and with the withdrawal of NATO forces from Afghanistan triggering fears of a new wave of migration to Europe through Turkey, Erdoğan cast doubt on the viability of this arrangement.

2017 Dutch–Turkish diplomatic crisis 

On March 11, 2017, there was a diplomatic crisis between the EU member Netherlands and Turkey. EU member Netherlands did not allow two Turkish ministers to enter its country. For example, the EU member Netherlands canceled the flight permit of Turkish Foreign Minister Mevlüt Çavuşoğlu, then did not allow Fatma Betül Sayan Kaya, the former Turkish Minister of Family and Social Policies, to enter her country, and expelled her.
The EU announced that it promised support and solidarity to the Netherlands, but did not promise support and solidarity to Turkey.

2018 EU–Turkey summit 
On March 26, 2018, the European Union–Turkey Summit was held in Varna, Bulgaria. The EU term chairman, former Bulgarian Prime Minister Boyko Borisov, former EU Council President Donald Tusk, former EU Commission President Jean-Claude Juncker, and Turkish President Recep Tayyip Erdoğan also attended the summit.

Turkish offensive in north-eastern Syria

High Representative Federica Mogherini issued a declaration on behalf of the EU on 9 October 2019 stating that "In light of the Turkish military operation in north-east Syria, the EU reaffirms that a sustainable solution to the Syrian conflict cannot be achieved militarily."
Finland and Sweden, the two European Union countries that want to become NATO members, stopped arms sales to Turkey due to Turkey's military operation in Syria.

Turkish espionage

In 2016, Bundestag Parliamentary Oversight Panel members demanded an answer from the German government regarding the reports that Germans of Turkish origin are being pressured in Germany by informers and officers of Turkey's MIT spy agency. According to reports Turkey had 6,000 informants plus MIT officers in Germany who were putting pressure on "German Turks". Hans-Christian Ströbele stated that there was an "unbelievable" level of "secret activities" in Germany by Turkey's MIT agency. According to Erich Schmidt-Eenboom, not even the former communist East German Stasi secret police had managed to run such a large "army of agents" in the former West Germany: "Here, it's not just about intelligence gathering, but increasingly about intelligence service repression."

In 2017, the Flemish interior minister, Liesbeth Homans, started the process of withdrawing recognition of the Turkish-sponsored and second largest mosque in the country, Fatih mosque in Beringen, accusing the mosque of spying in favor of Turkey.

In 2017, Austrian politician Peter Pilz released a report on the activities of Turkish agents operating through ATIB (Avusturya Türkiye İslam Birliği – Austria Turkey Islamic Foundation), the Diyanet's arm responsible for administering religious affairs across 63 mosques in the country, and other Turkish organisations. Pilz's website faced a DDoS attack by Turkish hacktivists and heavy security was provided when he presented the report publicly. Per the report, Turkey operates a clandestine network of 200 informants targeting opposition as well as Gülen supporters inside Austria.

Murders of Kurdish activists

In 1994, Mehmet Kaygisiz, a Kurdish man with links to the PKK (which is designated as a terrorist organisation by Turkey and the EU), was shot dead at a café in Islington, London. His murder remained unsolved and at the time his murder was thought to be drug-related, but in 2016 new documents suggest that Turkey's National Intelligence Organization (MIT) ordered his murder.

Turkey's MIT was blamed for the 2013 murders of three Kurdish activists in Paris.

United Nations arms embargo to Libya
The European Union launched Operation Irini with the primary task of enforcing the United Nations arms embargo to Libya because of the Second Libyan Civil War. During this period there were several incidents between the Irini forces and the Turkish forces.

Armenia–Turkey normalization process 

On 14 January 2022, the European Union welcomed the normalization of Armenia–Turkey relations.

Turkey's opposition to NATO membership of two EU member states 

In May 2022, Turkey opposed two EU member states, Finland and Sweden, joining NATO because according to Turkey, they host terrorist organisations which act against Turkey (including the PKK, KCK, PYD, YPG and Gulen movement). Turkey urged the countries to lift their arms embargo on Turkey, not to support the organizations, and to extradite members of the Gülen movement and PKK from the two member states. Turkey asked the two EU member states Finland and Sweden not to support the Gülen movement and the PKK. Turkey asked the two EU member states Finland and Sweden to lift the arms embargo. (However, the Gülen movement is not on the EU's list of terrorist organizations. and the PKK is on the EU's list of terrorist organizations).

2023 Turkey–Syria earthquake  
 
The European Union expressed its condolences to those who lost their lives due to the earthquake in Turkey and Syria, and wished the injured a speedy recovery. The EU has announced that they are ready to help Turkey and Syria.

Comparison

Summits

EU-Turkey Summits
1st EU-Turkey Summit: 26 March 2018 in Varna, Bulgaria
2nd EU-Turkey Summit: TBD in Stockholm, Sweden

Turkey's foreign relations with EU member states

  Austria
  Belgium
  Bulgaria
  Croatia
  Cyprus
  Czech Republic
  Denmark
  Estonia
  Finland
  France
  Germany
  Greece
  Hungary
  Ireland
  Italy
  Latvia
  Lithuania
  Luxembourg
  Malta
  Netherlands
  Poland
  Portugal
  Romania
  Slovakia
  Slovenia
  Spain
  Sweden

Diplomatic relations between Turkey and EU member states

See also
 Foreign relations of the European Union
 Foreign relations of Turkey 
 Enlargement of the European Union
 Independent Commission on Turkey 
 Accession of Turkey to the European Union 
 European Union–Turkey Customs Union
 Censorship in Turkey 
 Human rights in Turkey 
 Freedom of speech in Turkey 
 Freedom of the press in Turkey 
 Internet censorship in Turkey 
 Media freedom in Turkey 
 Censorship and media freedom in Turkey 
 Women rights in Turkey 
 Christianity in Turkey 
 Islam in Turkey
 Islam in Europe 
 Kurds in Turkey
 Turks in Europe
 2016–present purges in Turkey
 2017 Turkish constitutional referendum
 2017 Dutch–Turkish diplomatic incident 
 2018 Turkish general election
 2018 Turkish parliamentary election
 2018 Turkish presidential election 
 2019 Turkish local elections 
 2023 Turkish general election
 2023 Turkish parliamentary election
 2023 Turkish presidential election 
 2024 Turkish local elections
 European Union–NATO relations 
 Turkey–NATO relations
 Sofagate

External links 
Official website of European Union's delegation to Turkey
Official website of Turkey's permanent delegation to the European Union

References

 
Turkey